Saskatchewan's third largest city Prince Albert has 25 neighbourhoods with some being within others such as Central Business District being within Midtown.

East
Carlton Park
Central Business District
Crescent Acres
Crescent Heights
Cornerstone Shopping District
East End
East Flat
East Hill
Hamilton
Goshen
Normandy Park
North Industrial
Northeast
River Heights
Riverview
South Industrial
Southwood
The Yard District

Midtown
Central Business District

West
Hazeldell
Nordale
West Flat
Westview

West Hill
Lake's Edge

External links
City of Prince Albert
Neighbourhood Map with Zoning Districts

Neighbourhoods in Prince Albert, Saskatchewan
Prince Albert, Saskatchewan